H-E-B Center at Cedar Park is an indoor arena located in Cedar Park, Texas, near Austin.

Originally named the Cedar Park Center, the arena is home to the Texas Stars of the American Hockey League and the Austin Spurs of the NBA G League.

The 8,700-seat sports arena is located at the corner of 183A and New Hope Road in Cedar Park, Texas.

The city of Cedar Park owns the arena, which is operated by Texas Stars L.P., a division of Northland Properties, the owner of the Dallas Stars and Texas Stars. Since opening, the arena has hosted sporting events, concerts and high school graduations.

History
Construction began in 2008, at a cost of $55 million, and the new arena was officially opened in September 2009. Various local groups led construction efforts. The building's first event took place on September 25, 2009, featuring country music artist George Strait.

On April 22, 2016, it was announced that H-E-B had acquired the naming rights for the Cedar Park Center, and renamed the facility to H-E-B Center at Cedar Park.

Events
On February 18, 2011, the center hosted a Strikeforce MMA televised event, known as ShoMMA 14, with Lyle Beerbohm vs. Pat Healy headlining the show.

On November 11, 2018, Ozuna performed in the arena during his Aura Tour and sold over 3,000 tickets grossing over $300,000.

The center hosted an episode of AEW Dynamite on February 12, 2020, and Fyter Fest on July 14, 2021.

On September 10, 2022, the center hosted the inaugural "X Cup", the championship game of the 2022 X League season.

References

External links
Texas Stars website
Austin Spurs website

2009 establishments in Texas
Austin Spurs
Austin Toros
Basketball venues in Texas
Buildings and structures in Williamson County, Texas
Cedar Park, Texas
Indoor arenas in Texas
Indoor ice hockey venues in the United States
Mixed martial arts venues in Texas
NBA G League venues
Northland Properties
Sports venues completed in 2009
Sports venues in Texas
Texas Stars
Tourist attractions in Williamson County, Texas